Martina Hingis was the defending champion, but lost in the final to Lindsay Davenport 6–7(4–7), 6–4, 6–2.

Seeds
A champion seed is indicated in bold text while text in italics indicates the round in which that seed was eliminated. The top four seeds received a bye to the second round.

  Martina Hingis (final)
  Lindsay Davenport (champion)
  Anna Kournikova (semifinals)
  Amanda Coetzer (second round)
  Sandrine Testud (second round)
  Elena Likhovtseva (second round)
  Lisa Raymond (second round)
  Magdalena Maleeva (semifinals)

Draw

Final

Top half

Bottom half

References
 2001 Toray Pan Pacific Open Draw

Pan Pacific Open
Toray Pan Pacific Open - Singles
2001 Toray Pan Pacific Open